Union Grove can refer to:

Places 
United States of America
Union Grove, Alabama
Union Grove, Illinois
Union Grove Township, Whiteside County, Illinois
Union Grove Township, Iredell County, North Carolina
Union Grove, Texas
Union Grove, Wisconsin
Union Grove Township, Minnesota